The Project Management Institute (PMI, legally Project Management Institute, Inc.) is a U.S.-based not-for-profit professional organization for project management.

Overview 
PMI serves more than five million professionals including over 680,000 members in 217 countries and territories around the world, with 304 chapters and 14,000 volunteers serving local members in over 180 countries.

Its services include the development of standards, research, education, publication, networking-opportunities in local chapters, hosting conferences and training seminars, and providing accreditation in project management.

PMI has recruited volunteers to create industry standards, such as A Guide to the Project Management Body of Knowledge, a guide that sets out the standards that guide project management, and which shapes what is considered to be the PMI method.  Also, it has been recognized by the American National Standards Institute (ANSI). In 2012 ISO adapted the project management processes from the PMBOK Guide 4th edition.

History 
In the 1960s project management as such began to be used in the US aerospace, construction and defense industries. The Project Management Institute was founded  by Ned Engman (McDonnel Douglas Automation), James Snyder, Susan Gallagher (SmithKline & French Laboratories), Eric Jenett (Brown & Root) and J Gordon Davis (Georgia Institute of Technology)  at the Georgia Institute of Technology in 1969 as a nonprofit organization. It was incorporated in the state of Pennsylvania in the same year. PMI described its objectives in 1975 as to "foster recognition of the need for professionalism in project management; provide a forum for the free exchange of project management problems, solutions and applications; coordinate industrial and academic research efforts; develop common terminology and techniques to improve communications; provide interface between users and suppliers of hardware and software systems; and to provide guidelines for instruction and career development in the field of project management."

In the 1970s standardization efforts represented 10 to 15 percent of the institute's efforts. The functions were performed through the Professional Liaison Committee which called on and coordinated with the Technology, Research Policy and Education Committees. The institute participated in national activities through the American National Standards Committee XK 36.3 and internationally, through liaison with an appointed observer to Europe's International Project Management Association, by then called INTERNET. PMI did not deal with the US federal government directly; a number of members were federal employees in agencies involved with project management.

In the 1980s, efforts were made to standardize project management procedures and approaches. The PMI produced the first Project Management Body of Knowledge (PMBOK) in 1996.

In the late 1990s Virgil R. Carter became president of the PMI.  In 2002 Carter was succeeded by Gregory Balestrero, who directed the institute until his retirement in January 2011.  He was succeeded as President and CEO by Mark A. Langley.  From March 2019 through December 2021 the president and CEO was Sunil Prashara. Pierre Le Manh was appointed CEO on September 1, 2022.

Certifications 
Launched in 1984, PMI's first credential was the PMP. It has since become a de facto standard certification in project management. In 2007 it earned the ANSI/ISO/IEC 17024 accreditation from the International Organization for Standardization (ISO).  over one million people held the PMP credential.

PMI later introduced other certifications.  Credential holders do not have to be members of PMI.

To initially obtain a PMI credential, candidates must first document that they have met the required education and experience requirements.  They must then pass an examination consisting of multiple-choice questions.  To maintain most PMI credentials, holders must earn Professional Development Units (PDUs), which can be earned in a variety of ways such as taking classes, attending PMI global congresses, contributing to professional research or writing and publishing papers on the subject.  Most credentials must be renewed every three years. These are the certifications and credentials offered by PMI:

 1984: Project Management Professional (PMP)
 2003: Certified Associate in Project Management (CAPM)
 2007: Program Management Professional (PgMP)
 2008: PMI Scheduling Professional (PMI-SP)
 2008: PMI Risk Management Professional (PMI-RMP)
 2011: PMI Agile Certified Practitioner (PMI-ACP)
 2014: PMI Professional in Business Analysis (PMI-PBA)
 2014: Portfolio Management Professional (PfMP)
 2020: PMI Project Management Ready
 2020: Disciplined Agile Scrum Master (DASM) 
 2021: Disciplined Agile Senior Scrum Master (DASSM) 
 2021: Disciplined Agile Value Stream Consultant (DAVSC) 
 2021: Disciplined Agile Coach (DAC)

PMI also provided a Certified OPM3 Professional credential which was officially discontinued on March 1, 2017.  PMI no longer allows use of the credential's designation by individuals who formerly obtained it.  OPM3, even though no longer neither a credential nor a publication, remains a registered mark of PMI.

Standards 
The standards PMI develops and publishes fall into three main categories:
 Foundational Standards.  These standards provide a foundation for project management knowledge and represent the four areas of the profession: project, program, portfolio and the organizational approach to project management. They are the foundation on which practice standards and industry-specific extensions are built. According to PMI, standards are developed by volunteers in an open, consensus-based process including a public exposure draft process that allows the standard draft to be viewed and changes suggested.
 Practice Standards and Frameworks.  Practice standards describe the use of a tool, technique, or process identified in the PMBOK® Guide or other foundational standards. 
 Practice Guides. Practice guides provide supporting information and instruction to help one apply PMI's standards.  Practice guides may become potential standards and if so, would undergo the process for development of full consensus standards.

Here is a list of the current standards or guides in each category:

Foundational Standards
 A Guide to the Project Management Body of Knowledge (PMBOK Guide) – Seventh Edition (2021). Recognized by the American National Standards Institute (ANSI) as American National Standard ANSI/PMI 99-001-2021.
 The Standard for Program Management—Fourth Edition (2017). Recognized by ANSI as American National Standard ANSI/PMI 08-002-2017.
 The Standard for Portfolio Management—Fourth Edition (2017). Recognized by ANSI as American National Standard ANSI/PMI 08-003-2017.
 The Standard for Earned Value Management (2019).  Recognized by ANSI as American National Standard ANSI/PMI 19-006-2019.
 The Standard for Risk Management in Portfolios, Programs, and Projects (2019).
 The Standard for Organizational Project Management (2018).
 The PMI Guide to Business Analysis (2017), which includes The Standard for Business Analysis.

Practice Standards and Frameworks
 Practice Standard for Project Estimating—Second Edition (2019). 
 Practice Standard for Scheduling—Third Edition (2019).
 Practice Standard for Work Breakdown Structures—Third Edition (2019).
 Practice Standard for Project Configuration Management (2007).
 Project Manager Competency Development Framework—Third Edition (2017).

Practice Guides
 Benefits Realization Management: A Practice Guide (2019).
 Agile Practice Guide (2017).
 Requirements Management: A Practice Guide (2016).
 Governance of Portfolios, Programs, and Projects: A Practice Guide (2016).
 Business Analysis for Practitioners: A Practice Guide (2015).
 Navigating Complexity: A Practice Guide (2014).
 Managing Change in Organizations: A Practice Guide (2013).

PMI Lexicon of Project Management Terms
While not a standard, framework, or practice guide, the PMI Lexicon of Project Management Terms offers clear and concise definitions for nearly 200 of the profession’s frequently used terms.  Definitions in the Lexicon were developed by volunteer experts, and PMI standards committees are chartered to use the Lexicon terms without modification. Version 3.2 contains numerous revised terms based on requests from the 2017 foundational standard committees.

Awards 
PMI honors project management excellence in various categories, e.g.: project professionals, organizations, scholars, authors and continuing professional education providers.

See also
 List of international professional associations

References

External links
 

 
Business and finance professional associations
Organizations established in 1969
1969 establishments in Pennsylvania
Bodies of knowledge